The 2020 Hobart International was a women's tennis tournament played on outdoor hard courts. It was the 27th edition of the Hobart International and part of the WTA International tournaments of the 2020 WTA Tour. It took place at the Hobart International Tennis Centre in Hobart, Australia from 13 to 18 January 2020.

Points and prize money

Point distribution

Prize money

1 Points per the WTA.
2 Qualifiers prize money is also the Round of 32 prize money
* per team

Singles main-draw entrants

Seeds

1 Rankings as of 6 January 2020.

Other entrants
The following players received wildcards into the singles main draw:
  Lizette Cabrera
  Garbiñe Muguruza
  Astra Sharma
  Samantha Stosur

The following player received entry using a protected ranking into the singles main draw:
  Catherine Bellis

The following players received entry from the qualifying draw:
  Sorana Cîrstea (withdrew)
  Ons Jabeur
  Kateryna Kozlova
  Christina McHale 
  Sara Sorribes Tormo
  Heather Watson

The following player received entry as a lucky loser:
  Nina Stojanović

WTA doubles main-draw entrants

Seeds 

1 Rankings as of 6 January 2020

Other entrants 
The following pairs received wildcards into the doubles main draw:
  Lizette Cabrera /  Samantha Stosur 
  Jessica Moore /  Astra Sharma

The following pairs received entry into the doubles main draw using protected rankings:
  Kateryna Bondarenko /  Sharon Fichman
  Nadiia Kichenok /  Sania Mirza

Champions

Singles

  Elena Rybakina def.  Zhang Shuai 7–6(9–7), 6–3

Doubles

  Nadiia Kichenok /  Sania Mirza def.  Peng Shuai /  Zhang Shuai 6–4, 6–4

References

External links
Official website

 
Hobart International
Hobart International
Hobart International
Hobart International